Mirela Barbălată (-Hübner) (born October 23, 1967) is a Romanian retired artistic gymnast. At the 1983 World Championships, she won a silver medal with the Romanian team and scored a perfect ten on vault, the highest qualifying score for the vault final. However, she did not compete in the final; the Romanian finalists were Lavinia Agache and Ecaterina Szabo, who won the silver and bronze medals, respectively.

After retiring from gymnastics, Barbălată immigrated to Germany. There, she married the German marathoner Christian Hübner, with whom she competes in marathons.

Competitive history

References

External links
 

1967 births
Living people
Romanian female artistic gymnasts
Medalists at the World Artistic Gymnastics Championships
20th-century Romanian women